Savenaca Tokula (born 15 June 1985 in Fiji) is a Fijian-born New Zealand rugby union player. He plays as either a centre or wing.

Waikato
Tokula made his debut for Waikato against Wellington in September 2008.

Chiefs

Munster
It was announced on 15 February 2012 that Tokula would be joining Munster for the remainder of the 2011–12 season, to provide support in the backs following injuries. He arrived in Ireland on 19 February 2012. His first training session with the Munster squad was on 21 February 2012. Tokula made his debut for Munster against Newport Gwent Dragons during a Pro12 league fixture on 3 March 2012. Tokula returned to New Zealand at the end of the 2011–12 Pro 12 season.

References

External links
Waikato profile
espnscrum.com profile
World Rugby Sevens Series profile

Living people
1985 births
Fijian rugby union players
Fijian emigrants to New Zealand
Chiefs (rugby union) players
Waikato rugby union players
Munster Rugby players
Rugby union centres
Rugby union wings
New Zealand expatriate rugby union players
Expatriate rugby union players in Ireland
Expatriate rugby union players in France
New Zealand expatriate sportspeople in Ireland
Fijian expatriate rugby union players
Fijian expatriate sportspeople in Ireland
New Zealand international rugby sevens players